Saeid lotfi is an Iranian football defender, who currently plays for Sanat Naft in Iran Pro League.

Club career
Lotfi joined Saba Qom in 2012 after spending the previous year at Shahrdari Arak. In the summer of 2014 Lotfi signed a two-year contract with Naft Tehran.

Club career statistics

International

U17
Lotfi featured for Iran in the 2009 FIFA U-17 World Cup.

U22
He invited to National U-22 team in 2012 by Alireza Mansourian.

References

External links
 Saeid Lotfi at Persian League
 Saeid Lotfi at Footballdatabase

Living people
Shahrdari Arak F.C. players
Rah Ahan players
Sepahan S.C. footballers
Saba players
Naft Tehran F.C. players
Iranian footballers
Iran under-20 international footballers
1992 births
Association football defenders